N. Lester Troast (1899–1958) was an American architect from Sitka and Juneau, Alaska, who was one of the first professional architects to practice in Alaska.

Life and career
Troast began his career in the 1920s, as a teacher at Sitka's Sheldon Jackson School.  Circa 1930, he left the school and established an architect's office in Sitka.  At that time, he was noted as Alaska's only professional architect.  Later that year he moved his office to Juneau, the largest city in the then-territory.  He quickly associated with William A. Manley, who would become a partner in N. Lester Troast & Associates in 1935.  Manley was sent to Anchorage in late 1937 to open an office for the firm in that city.  Troast moved to New Jersey, and Manley opened his own Anchorage office in 1941.

In New Jersey, Troast lived in Clifton, and was associated with the family firm, the Mahoney-Troast Construction Company, headquartered in Passaic.

William Manley would go on to have a notable career as the senior partner in the Anchorage firm of Manley & Mayer.

Works

N. Lester Troast, before 1935
 1929 - Sage Memorial Building, Sheldon Jackson School, Sitka, Alaska
 1930 - Eielson Memorial Building, University of Alaska, Fairbanks, Alaska
 Completed in 1940 by the H. B. Foss Company.
 1932 - St. Peter's Episcopal Church (Alterations), 611 Lincoln St, Sitka, Alaska.
 1933 - Mayflower School, St Anns Ave, Douglas, Alaska
 1935 - Original buildings, Matanuska Valley Colony, Palmer, Alaska
 In association with David Williams of Washington, DC.
 1935 - U. S. Federal Building (Old), Front St & Federal Way, Nome, Alaska
 With Gilbert Stanley Underwood of Los Angeles.

N. Lester Troast & Associates, 1935-1941
 1935 - Decker Building, 231 S Franklin St, Juneau, Alaska
 1935 - Juneau Motor Building, 2 Marine Way, Juneau, Alaska
 Burned.
 1936 - Alaska Electric Light and Power Building, 134 N Franklin St, Juneau, Alaska
 1936 - Alaska Governor's Mansion (Remodeling), 716 Calhoun St, Juneau, Alaska
 1937 - Douglas City Hall, 1016 3rd St, Douglas, Alaska
 Demolished.
 1938 - Bunkhouse, Independence Mines, Palmer, Alaska
 1938 - Shrine of St. Thérèse, 21425 Glacier Hwy, Juneau, Alaska
 1940 - Howard Romig House, 440 L St, Anchorage, Alaska

References

1899 births
1958 deaths
20th-century American architects
Architects from Alaska
Architects from New Jersey
People from Juneau, Alaska